Pavonia hastata, commonly known as spearleaf swampmallow or pink pavonia, is a shrub in the family Malvaceae. The species is native to Brazil, Bolivia, Argentina, Paraguay and Uruguay. It was previously considered to be native to Australia as well, but is no longer thought to be.

Plants grow to 1.5 metre high and have leaves that are 10 to 60 mm long and 10 to 25 mm wide. The hibiscus-like flowers are pink with a red throat. These appear in summer and autumn.

The species is easily propagated by seed or cuttings.

References

Hibisceae
Flora of Argentina
Flora of Bolivia
Flora of Brazil
Flora of Paraguay
Flora of Uruguay
Taxa named by Antonio José Cavanilles